Rafael Escalas Bestard (born February 24, 1961) is a former competitive swimmer from Spain.  Escalas competed on the 1980 and 1984 Spanish Olympic teams, and swam competitively in the United States for the University of California, Los Angeles (UCLA).

Escalas received an athletic scholarship to attend UCLA, where he competed for coach Ron Ballatore's UCLA Bruins swimming and diving team in National Collegiate Athletic Association (NCAA) competition.  In 1981 he set the NCAA record in the men's 1,650-yard freestyle (time: 14:53.90).  Escalas is the only swimmer to win an NCAA championship after being seeded last. He was also a member of the UCLA's NCAA national championship team in 1982.

Escalas also competed in two Olympic Games: 1980 in Moscow, where he placed 6th in the 1500-meter freestyle event, and 1984 in Los Angeles, where he placed 11th in the 1500-meter freestyle. Escalas was also part of Spain's 4x200-meter freestyle relay in Los Angeles. In terms of world rankings, Escalas was ranked third in the world in the 1,500-meter freestyle in 1981, with a time of 15:17.93, which was a Spanish national record for over 19 years.

In recent Summer Olympics, Escalas served as Technical Director of the Swimming Competition (Barcelona 1992) and Competition Manager of Swimming (Atlanta 1996). A sports center in Palma de Mallorca is named after Rafa and his brother, Juan Enrique: Germans Escalas. Rafa is currently President and CEO of competitive swimwear manufacturer AgonSwim.

Experience as an athlete and as a swimwear manufacturer lead Escalas to be the athlete's representative on the FINA Scientific Commission for Suits (he has since stepped down from the committee).  The commission was established to maintain the standards of swimwear and limit the impact that advanced technology might have on performance. FINA set January 1, 2010 as the date that polyurethane suits were banned from competitive swimming.

Rafa is married to Jennifer Edson Escalas, a professor at Vanderbilt University, and has two daughters: Elena Escalas, who also swims at UCLA, and Marina Escalas.

Notes

References

1961 births
Living people
Spanish male freestyle swimmers
Olympic swimmers of Spain
Swimmers at the 1980 Summer Olympics
Swimmers at the 1984 Summer Olympics
Mediterranean Games gold medalists for Spain
Mediterranean Games medalists in swimming
Swimmers at the 1983 Mediterranean Games
European Aquatics Championships medalists in swimming
Sportspeople from Palma de Mallorca
UCLA Bruins men's swimmers
Swimmers at the 1979 Mediterranean Games